Provincial Road 216 (PR 216) is a provincial road in the Canadian province of Manitoba.  The north-south road lies mostly within the Rural Municipality of Hanover, beginning at PR 311 near New Bothwell and ending at PTH 59 near Rosa.  PR 216 has a one-kilometre concurrency with PTH 52, between New Bothwell and Kleefeld, and a five-kilometre concurrency with Provincial Road 205 through Grunthal.

PR 216 forms the Main Streets for the communities of New Bothwell, Kleefeld, and Grunthal.

References

External links 
Manitoba Official Map

216